Jacob "Koos" Arnold Maasdijk (born 19 September 1968 in Rotterdam, South Holland) is a former rower from the Netherlands, who won the gold medal with the men's eights at the 1996 Summer Olympics in Atlanta, Georgia. He had also competed at the 1992 Summer Olympics, finishing fifth in the men's fours.

References

1968 births
Living people
Dutch male rowers
Olympic rowers of the Netherlands
Olympic gold medalists for the Netherlands
Rowers at the 1992 Summer Olympics
Rowers at the 1996 Summer Olympics
Sportspeople from Rotterdam
Olympic medalists in rowing
Medalists at the 1996 Summer Olympics
20th-century Dutch people
21st-century Dutch people